Boeremia is a genus of fungi belonging to the family Didymellaceae. It was first described by M.M. Aveskamp, J. de Gruyter, J.H.C. Woudenberg, G.J.M. Verkley and P.W. Crous in 2010, and the type species is Boeremia exigua. 

The genus has almost cosmopolitan distribution.

Species:

Boeremia crinicola 
Boeremia diversispora 
Boeremia exigua

References

External links
Boeremia occurrence data and images from GBIF

Pleosporales
Dothideomycetes genera